Le'Bryan Nash (born June 30, 1992) is an American professional basketball player who last played for Maccabi Haifa of the Israeli Premier League. He played college basketball for Oklahoma State University.

High school career
Nash attended Lincoln High School. He was rated as the #6 player by Rivals.com, and the #8 player by Scout.com. In the ESPNU 100 basketball rankings, Nash was the 3rd ranked small forward in his class.

|}

College career
On October 21, 2010, Nash committed and signed to play basketball with Oklahoma State University after visiting the campus on August 20 of the same year. Oklahoma State Cowboys head coach Travis Ford stated that Le'Bryan Nash's arrival to the Cowboys basketball team "makes us better immediately."

College statistics

|-
| style="text-align:left;"| 2011–12
| style="text-align:left;"| Oklahoma State
| 28 || 23 || 25.1 || .394 || .235 || .730 || 5.0 || 1.5 || 0.6 || 0.4 || 13.3
|-
| style="text-align:left;"| 2012–13
| style="text-align:left;"| Oklahoma State
| 33 || 32 || 31.9 || .462 || .240 || .741 || 4.1 || 1.8 || 0.6 || 0.2 || 14.0
|-
| style="text-align:left;"| 2013–14
| style="text-align:left;"| Oklahoma State
| 34 || 34 || 29.9 || .520 || .000 || .739 || 5.5 || 1.6 || 0.5 || 0.8 || 13.9
|-
| style="text-align:left;"| 2014–15
| style="text-align:left;"| Oklahoma State
| 31 || 31 || 31.7 || .462 || .100 || .791 || 5.7 || 2.0 || 0.8 || 0.9 || 17.2
|-
| style="text-align:left;"| Career
| style="text-align:left;"| Oklahoma State
| 126 || 120 || 30.9 || .460 || .208 || .754 || 5.1 || 1.7 || 0.6 || 0.6 || 14.6

Professional career

Fukushima Firebonds (2015–2016)
After going undrafted in the 2015 NBA Draft, Nash signed a one-season contract with the Fukushima Firebonds of the Japanese bj league in September 2015 and made his professional debut in the season-opening match against the Yokohama B-Corsairs on October 3, 2015. On February 28, 2016 he scored 54 points in a game against the Shinshu Brave Warriors, the highest score in the league's 10-year history and passing the previous total of 53 points set by Rizing Fukuoka's Michael Parker in November 2010.

Rio Grande Valley Vipers (2016–2017)
On October 22, 2016, Nash signed with the Houston Rockets, but was waived two days later. On October 31, 2016, he was acquired by the Rio Grande Valley Vipers of the NBA Development League as an affiliate player of the Rockets. On February 16, 2017, Nash was waived by the Vipers.

Busan KT Sonicboom / Houston Rockets (2017–2018)
On December 24, 2017, Nash signed with Busan KT Sonicboom of the Korean Basketball League.

On March 23, 2018, Nash signed a 10-day contract with the Houston Rockets. However he was waived on March 31 without playing a game for the Rockets.

Tokyo Hachioji Bee Trains (2018–2019)

On August 24, 2018, Tokyo Hachioji Bee Trains of the B.League had been reported to have tabbed Nash.

Maccabi Haifa (2020)
After spending the 2019–20 season with Peñarol in Uruguay where he averaged 19.8 points per game, Nash signed with Maccabi Haifa of the Israeli Premier League on August 14, 2020. In the first two games, he averaged 14.5 points and 6.5 rebounds per game. He was released by the team due to disciplinary reasons on October 24, 2020.

Personal life
Nash became a father in September 2014 to a daughter, LeKenleigh Nash.

Awards and honors 
2008 Newcomer the Year
2009 and 2010 All-Area First Team
2009 and 2010 All-State
2010 FIBA America U18 Champion
2011 McDonald's All-American team selection
3 time (2008, 2009, 2010) All-Conference selection

References

External links
Oklahoma State Bio
ESPNU Profile
USA Basketball bio
Scout.com Profile
Rivals.com Profile

1992 births
Living people
American expatriate basketball people in Japan
Basketball players from Dallas
Suwon KT Sonicboom players
Fukushima Firebonds players
McDonald's High School All-Americans
Oklahoma State Cowboys basketball players
Parade High School All-Americans (boys' basketball)
Rio Grande Valley Vipers players
Shooting guards
Small forwards
Tokyo Hachioji Bee Trains players
American men's basketball players